Villa Rendena (locally called Villa) was a comune (municipality) in Trentino in the northern Italian region Trentino-Alto Adige/Südtirol, located about  west of Trento.   It was merged with Vigo Rendena and Darè on January 1, 2016, to form a new municipality, Porte di Rendena.
 

 

Cities and towns in Trentino-Alto Adige/Südtirol